Bonny Chingangbam Singh (born 1 February 1996) is an Indian cricketer. He made his List A debut for Manipur in the 2018–19 Vijay Hazare Trophy on 19 September 2018. He made his first-class debut for Manipur in the 2018–19 Ranji Trophy on 1 November 2018. He made his Twenty20 debut for Manipur in the 2018–19 Syed Mushtaq Ali Trophy on 25 February 2019.

References

External links
 

1996 births
Living people
Indian cricketers
Manipur cricketers
Place of birth missing (living people)